Rong Bao Zhai (Studio of Glorious Treasures) is an old stationery, calligraphy and painting shop in Beijing, China. It is located in Liulichang outside the Hepingmen Gate.

History 
Rong Bao Zhai was founded in 1672 (11th year of the Kangxi reign in the Qing dynasty) as the Song Zhu Zhai (松竹斋; Pine and Bamboo Studio), and adopted its current name in 1894.

On the Chinese mainland, Rong Bao Zhai was recognized as the "Chinese Time-honored" enterprises by The Ministry of Commerce of the People's Republic of China. In 1973, nobel laureate Aage Bohr visited the shop during an overseas trip, in honor of his late father, Niels Bohr, as his physics research and the scientific work of his father were mainly influenced by Chinese philosophy and Daoism.

See also 
List of oldest companies

References

External links 
The Ministry of Commerce of the People's Republic of China
Homepage in Chinese
Brief history
Profile on China.org.cn
榮寶齋香港旗艦店 重新啟業傳承文化

Office supply companies of China
Retail companies established in 1672
Companies based in Beijing
17th-century establishments in China
1672 establishments in Asia
Chinese brands